Guachinango may refer to:

 Guachinango, Jalisco, a municipality in Jalisco state, Mexico
 Guachinango, a 1964 album by Dominican Johnny Pacheco
 Guachinango Island, a small islet in the San José Lagoon in San Juan, Puerto Rico
 Guachinango or Huachinango, a Spanish derivation from the Nahuatl language meaning red snapper, see red snapper (disambiguation)